Dimitri Konyshev (Russian Дмитрий Борисович Конышев; born 18 February 1966 in Gorky) is a Russian former road bicycle racer. During the 1989 World Championship he can be seen in a rather famous photo of cycling history showing the agony of defeat in 2nd place behind Greg LeMond's display of the intensity of victory. In 1990 Konyshev would become the first ever rider from the Soviet Union to win a stage in the Tour de France. While the Soviet's would not allow their riders to join the professional teams until a short while before the end of the Cold War in the 1991 Tour de France, Soviet riders had remarkable success winning 5 stages. One by Viatcheslav Ekimov, two by Djamolidine Abdoujaparov who also won the Green Jersey and two stage wins by Konyshev. His victory in stage 17 also made him the last rider for the Soviet Union to win a Tour de France stage.

All total in his professional career Konyshev would win nine Grand Tour stages becoming one of the few riders to win a stage in all three Grand Tours. He won 4 apiece in the Tour de France and the Giro d'Italia, and he also won a single stage in the Vuelta a España. He followed his silver medal at the 1989 World Championship with a bronze medal in 1992 at Benidorm and later in his career during the 2000 Giro d'Italia he won the Points Classification, as well as the overall Combativity Award.

Major results
Sources:

1986
 1st Stage 10 Coors Classic
 3rd Soviet National Road Race Championships
1987
 1st Overall USSR Tour
 1st  Overall Österreich-Rundfahrt
1st Stage 3
 1st  Overall Giro delle Regioni
1st Stages 2, 4 & 6
 Tour de l'Avenir
1st  Points classification
1st Stage 6
 1st Gran Premio della Liberazione
 1st GP Palio del Recioto
 5th Overall Tour of Sochi
1st Stage 6
 8th Overall Peace Race
1988
 1st  Overall Giro Ciclistico d'Italia
1st Stages 2, 4 & 6
 1st Stage 2 (Team time trial) Tour de Pologne
 1st Stages 3 & 5 Giro delle Regioni
 Vuelta a Cuba
1st  Points classification
1st Stages 4 & 11
 3rd Gran Premio della Liberazione
 3rd Overall Tour of Sochi
1989
 1st Coppa Ugo Agostoni
 1st Giro dell'Emilia
 1st  Overall Cronostafetta
 1st  Points classification, Tour of Belgium
 2nd  Road race, UCI Road World Championships
 2nd Giro di Toscana
 2nd Trittico Premondiale I
 3rd Overall Settimana Ciclistica Lombarda
1st Stage 2
 4th Gran Premio Città di Camaiore
 6th Trittico Premondiale
 7th Trofeo Baracchi
1990
 1st  Soviet National Road Race Championships
 1st Stage 17 Tour de France
 1st GP Industria & Artigianato di Larciano
 4th Giro del Veneto
 8th Gent–Wevelgem
 9th Giro di Toscana
 10th Dwars door België
1991
 1st Stages 19 & 22 Tour de France
 1st Stage 3 Tirreno–Adriatico
 5th La Flèche Wallonne
 5th GP de la Libération (TTT)
 6th Trittico Premondiale I
 8th Overall Critérium International
 8th Grand Prix Cerami
1992
 1st Stage 6 Vuelta a Asturias
 2nd Road race, National Road Championships
 3rd  Road race, UCI Road World Championships
 3rd Amstel Gold Race
 4th Clásica de San Sebastián
1993
 1st  Road race, National Road Championships
 1st Stages 5 & 12 Giro d'Italia
 4th Gran Piemonte
 4th Giro di Romagna
 9th Giro di Lombardia
1994
 1st Stage 1 Ronde van Nederland
 3rd Trittico Premondiale
 4th Giro di Lombardia
 5th Road race, UCI Road World Championships
 5th Gran Premio Città di Camaiore
 5th Giro del Lazio
 6th Giro del Friuli
 7th Gent–Wevelgem
 8th Milano–Torino
 8th Rund um den Henninger Turm
 9th Firenze–Pistoia
1995
 1st Giro del Friuli
 3rd Overall Tirreno–Adriatico
 3rd Brabantse Pijl
 4th Overall Tour Méditerranéen
 4th GP Ouest–France
 5th Gran Piemonte
 6th Trittico Premondiale I
 7th Road race, UCI Road World Championships
 7th Milan–San Remo
 9th Nice–Alassio
1996
 1st  Overall Hofbrau Cup
1st Stages 1 & 4
 1st Stage 18 Vuelta a España
 2nd Buhl International
 3rd Road race, National Road Championships
 10th Overall Tour of Galicia
 10th Giro del Veneto
1997
 1st Grand Prix de Wallonie
 Giro d'Italia
1st  Intergiro classification 
1st Stage 9
 1st Stage 6 Tirreno–Adriatico
 1st Stage 6 Tour de Pologne
 Vuelta a Murcia
1st  Points classification
1st Stage 4 
 3rd GP du canton d'Argovie
 10th Giro del Lazio
1998
 1st Stage 4 Volta a la Comunitat Valenciana
 3rd Road race, National Road Championships
 5th Clásica de Almería
1999
 1st Coppa Sabatini
 1st Grand Prix de Fourmies
 1st Stage 14 Tour de France
 1st  Mountains classification Volta a Catalunya
 3rd Giro del Lazio
 5th Giro di Lombardia
 7th Milano–Torino
 9th Road race, UCI Road World Championships
2000
 1st Giro della Romagna
 Giro d'Italia
1st  Points classification
1st Stage 6
 1st Sprint classification Tour de Romandie
 5th Trofeo Pantalica
 5th Giro della Provincia di Siracusa
 8th Coppa Sabatini
 10th Road race, Summer Olympics
2001
 1st  Road race, National Road Championships
 1st Coppa Sabatini
 1st Giro di Campania
 Tour de Suisse
1st  Mountains classification
1st Stage 5
 3rd Giro del Lazio
 6th Gran Premio Bruno Beghelli
 7th Giro di Romagna
 8th Giro della Provincia di Siracusa
2002
 7th GP Industria & Commercio di Prato
 9th Rund um den Henninger Turm
2003
 7th GP Industria Artigianato e Commercio Carnaghese
2004
 1st Tour du Lac Léman
 1st Stage 4a Euskal Bizikleta
 3rd Giro di Toscana
 3rd Giro della Provincia di reggio Calabria
 4th Giro d'Oro
 7th Stausee Rundfahrt
 10th Coppa Sabatini
2005
 1st Stage 1 Vuelta a Asturias
 1st  Mountain classification Settimana Internazionale di Coppi e Bartali
 4th Giro di Toscana
 9th Giro della Provincia di reggio Calabria

General classification results timeline

Classics results timeline

References

External links

Palmarès by cyclingbase.com 

1966 births
Living people
Soviet male cyclists
Russian male cyclists
Olympic cyclists of Russia
Cyclists at the 1996 Summer Olympics
Cyclists at the 2000 Summer Olympics
Russian Giro d'Italia stage winners
Russian Tour de France stage winners
Russian Vuelta a España stage winners
Tour de Suisse stage winners
Tour de France Champs Elysées stage winners
Sportspeople from Nizhny Novgorod